Damian Basil D'Oliveira (19 October 1960 – 29 June 2014) was a South African-born English cricketer who played first-class cricket for Worcestershire, and was the Academy Director of Worcestershire County Cricket Club.

Playing for Worcestershire between 1982 and 1995, during his career he scored more than 9,000 first-class runs, with a best single-innings total of 237. He helped Worcestershire to the County Championship in 1988 and 1989, the Benson and Hedges Cup in 1991, and the NatWest Trophy in 1994.

His father, Basil, played first-class cricket for Worcestershire from 1964 to 1980, and England from 1966 to 1972. His uncle, Ivan, also played first-class cricket for Leicestershire in 1967. His son, Brett, currently plays for Worcestershire.

After a two-and-a-half-year battle, D'Oliveira died of cancer in the early hours of 29 June 2014. He was survived by his wife and three children.

References

External links
Cricinfo article on Damian D'Oliveira

1960 births
2014 deaths
South African cricketers
Worcestershire cricketers
Cricketers from Cape Town
Deaths from cancer in England
South African people of Portuguese descent
English cricketers
English sportspeople of South African descent
British sportspeople of Indian descent
British Asian cricketers